The 2013 NCAA Division II men's basketball tournament involved 64 schools playing in a single-elimination tournament to determine the national champion of men's NCAA Division II college basketball as a culmination of the 2012–13 basketball season.

The eight regional winners met at the Elite Eight for the quarterfinal and semifinal rounds held at Freedom Hall in Louisville, Kentucky.  As part of the festivities surrounding the 75th edition of the NCAA tournament, the championship game was played at Philips Arena in Atlanta on April 7, 2013.

Qualification and tournament format
The champions of 22 of the 24 Division II basketball conferences qualified automatically. The Great Midwest Athletic Conference, in its first season of operation, and the Great American Conference, in its second season, were not eligible for automatic berths. (The Great American became eligible for an automatic berth with the 2014 tournament. The G-MAC did not receive an automatic berth until 2016 because it was not officially recognized as a D-II conference until 2013–14.) An additional 42 teams were selected as at-large participants by the selection committee. As in previous years, the first three rounds of the tournament were organized in regions comprising eight participants in groups of two or three conferences (two in the Central and Midwest regions) with seeds assigned by the selection committee.

Traditionally, the Elite Eight regional winners meet in one site for the quarterfinals, semifinals, and finals. However, as noted above, this was changed for 2013 only, with the quarterfinals and semifinals held in Louisville and the final game in Atlanta.

This was the final tournament for the West Virginia Intercollegiate Athletic Conference, which disbanded at the end of the 2012–13 school year, with most of the members forming the new Mountain East Conference.

Automatic qualifiers
The following teams automatically qualified for the national tournament as the champions of their conference tournaments:

Regionals

East - Rindge, New Hampshire
Location: Franklin Pierce Fieldhouse Host: Franklin Pierce University

South Central - Denver, Colorado
Location: Auraria Events Center Host: Metropolitan State University

Central - Mankato, Minnesota
Location: Taylor Center Host: Minnesota State University, Mankato

Atlantic - West Liberty, West Virginia
Location: Academic, Sports, and Recreation Complex Host: West Liberty University

South - Lakeland, Florida
Location: Jenkins Field House Host: Florida Southern College

West - Bellingham, Washington
Location: Sam Carver Gymnasium Host: Western Washington University

All-West Region team: Kwame Alexander (F/CSU San Bernardino) Jobi Wall (F/Seattle Pacific) Patrick Simon (F/Seattle Pacific) John Allen (G/Western Washington) Region Most Outstanding Player Richard Woodworth (G/Western Washington)

Midwest - Springfield, Missouri
Location: Weiser Gymnasium Host: Drury University

Southeast - Aiken, South Carolina
Location: USCA Convocation Center Host: University of South Carolina, Aiken

Elite Eight – Louisville, Kentucky and Atlanta, Georgia 
Venues: Freedom Hall (Louisville), Philips Arena (Atlanta)

All-tournament team
 Alex Hall (Drury)
 Brandon Jefferson (Metropolitan State)
 Brandon Lockhart (Drury)
 Mitch McCarron (Metropolitan State)
 Jonathan Morse (Metropolitan State)

References
 2013 NCAA Division II men's basketball tournament jonfmorse.com

NCAA Division II men's basketball tournament
Tournament
NCAA Division II basketball tournament
NCAA Division II basketball tournament
NCAA Division II basketball tournament
NCAA Division II basketball tournament